The 2022 East–West Shrine Bowl was the 97th edition of the all–star college football exhibition to benefit Shriners Hospital for Children. The game was played at Allegiant Stadium in Paradise, Nevada, on February 3, 2022, at 5:00 p.m. PST, televised on the NFL Network. It was one of the final 2021–22 bowl games concluding the 2021 FBS football season. The game featured NCAA players (predominantly from the Football Bowl Subdivision) and one invitee from Canadian university football—Deionte Knight, a defensive lineman from the Western Mustangs.

Background
The game featured more than 100 players from the 2021 NCAA Division I FBS football season and prospects for the 2022 NFL Draft. This was the first edition of the game to be played in the Las Vegas Valley, and the first to be played in February. Organizers announced that, for the first time, team personnel would be assigned by NFL personnel groupings, such as one team playing a 4–3 defense and the other team playing a 3–4 defense.

Coaching
The coaches for the East–West Shrine Bowl were announced on January 22, 2022; coaching staffs were selected from assistant coaches nominated by National Football League (NFL) teams that did not qualify for the NFL postseason.

Game summary
Teams were required to attempt two-point conversions.

Notes

References

East West Shrine Bowl
East–West Shrine Bowl
Events in Paradise, Nevada
American football in Nevada
Sports competitions in Las Vegas
East West Shrine Bowl
East-West Shrine Bowl